Pitcairnia feliciana is a plant endemic to central Guinea in West Africa and is the only species of bromeliad not native to the Americas. It can be found growing on sandstone outcrops (inselbergs) of the Fouta Djallon highlands in Middle Guinea.

Its specific epithet feliciana commemorates  (1907–2008), the French botanist who first collected it. In 1937, he discovered the plants growing on the steep rocks of Mount Gangan, near Kindia in the former French Guinea.

The speciation occurred around 10 million years ago, therefore its distribution cannot be due to continental drift, the Americas having separated from Africa much earlier. The species probably originates from seeds dispersed by migrating birds.

It has bright orange-red, scentless flowers with abundant nectar that are typical of other bromeliads having birds as pollinators, although no actual sighting of birds pollinating the species has been recorded yet.

References

External links
Picture on the site of the Bromeliad Society International
Picture of Pitcairnia feliciana

feliciana
Endemic flora of Guinea
Plants described in 1938
Taxa named by Auguste Chevalier